Jordan Oliver may refer to:
 Jordan Oliver (amateur wrestler) (born 1990), American freestyle and graduated folkstyle wrestler
 Jordan Oliver (professional wrestler) (born 1999), American professional wrestler